The nominations for the 3rd South Indian International Movie Awards were announced at a press conference held at a five star hotel in Hyderabad on July 17, 2014. Actors Rana Daggubati and Shriya Saran, who are the brand ambassadors of SIIMA, were present on the occasion.

The SIIMA Awards 2014 event was held at Negara Stadium Kuala Lampur, Malaysia on September 12 and 13, 2014. Trisha, Nivin Pauly, Silambarasan , Tamannaah, Anirudh Ravichander, Devi Sri Prasad, Shriya Saran, Shiva Rajkumar, Lakshmi Menon, Regina Cassandra and Rakul Preet Singh performed.

Honorary awards

Lifetime Achievement Award 
 K. Raghavendra Rao
 K. Bhagyaraj

Special appreciation 
 Chiranjeevi - Ambassador of Indian cinema
 Satyapaul Madem- youth icon of south India

Main awards

Film

Acting

Music

Choreography

Generation Next Awards 
Youth Icon of South Indian Cinema (male) – Puneeth Rajkumar
Youth Icon of South Indian Cinema (female) – Asin Thottumkal
Romantic Star of South Indian Cinema – Nivin Pauly
Stylish Star of South Indian Cinema – Silambarasan
Rising Star of South Indian Cinema (female) – Lakshmi Menon
Sensation of South Indian Cinema (male) – Sivakarthikeyan
Couple of the year – A. L. Vijay and Amala Paul
Most Popular Actress in South India on Social Media – Trisha
 Best Actress critics in Telugu - Tamannaah -Thadaka

References

External links
 
 

South Indian International Movie Awards
2013 Indian film awards